All countries in the Americas use codes that start with "5" except for: Canada, the United States and some Caribbean countries under the North American Numbering Plan use country calling code 1 and Greenland and Aruba with a country calling code starting with the number "2", which mostly is used by countries in Africa.

Listing
(initial ordering by country)

See also
Telephone numbering plan
National conventions for writing telephone numbers
List of country calling codes
List of international call prefixes
List of North American Numbering Plan area codes
Area codes in the Caribbean
:Category:Telephone numbers by country

International telecommunications
Telecommunications in Central America
Telecommunications in the Caribbean
Telecommunications in North America
Telecommunications in South America
Telephone numbers